The Dent de Folliéran (2,340 m) is a mountain of the Fribourg Alps, located south of Charmey in the Swiss canton of Fribourg. It lies on the chain connecting the Vanil Noir to the Dent de Brenleire. It is one of the five summits above 2,300 metres in the canton, the other being the Vanil Noir, the Vanil de L'Ecri, the Pointe de Paray and the Dent de Brenleire.

References

External links
 Dent de Folliéran on Hikr

Mountains of the Alps
Mountains of Switzerland
Two-thousanders of Switzerland
Mountains of the canton of Fribourg